Eusebio or Eusébio may refer to:

Eusébio Cup, Portuguese football match hosted by S.L. Benfica
Eusébio de Queirós Law, Brazilian law enacted in 1850 to abolish slavery
KC Eusebio, action shooting competitor
Premio Eusebio Lorenzo Baleirón, poetry prize of Dodro, Spain

People

Name
Édgar Eusebio Millán Gómez (1967–2008), a Mexican police agent
Eusébio (1942–2014), Portuguese footballer
Eusébio (footballer, born 1966), Portuguese former footballer
Eusebio (Spanish footballer) (b. 1964), Spanish footballer
Eusebio Acasuzo (b. 1952), Peruvian former footballer
Eusebio Acea (b. 1969), Cuban Olympian rower
Eusebio Asquerino (1822–1892), Spanish romantic era poet and playwright
Eusebio Ayala (1875–1942), two-term president of Paraguay
Eusébio Bancessi (b. 1995), Bissau-Guinean footballer
Eusebio Bardají y Azara (1776–1842, Spanish Minister of Foreign Affairs
Eusebio Bejarano (b. 1948), Spanish former footballer
Eusebio Bertrand (1930–2011), Spanish Olympian sailor
Eusebio Blankendal (b. 1998), Bermudian footballer
Eusebio Blasco (1844–1903), Spanish journalist, poet, and playwright
Eusebio Cáceres (b. 1991), Spanish track and field athlete
Eusebio Cardoso (1950–2018), Paraguayan Olympian long-distance runner
Eusebio Castigliano (1921–1949), Italian footballer
Eusebio Chamorro (b. 1922), Argentine former footballer
Eusebio da San Giorgio (c. 1470–c. 1550), Italian Renaissance painter
Eusebio Delfín (1893–1965), Cuban banker and musician
Eusebio de Almeida (b. 1985), East Timorese footballer
Eusebio de Granito (d. 1528), Bishop of Capri
Eusébio de Matos (1629–1692), Portuguese orator, painter, and poet
Eusébio de Queirós (1812–1868), Brazilian Minister of Justice
Eusebio Di Francesco (b. 1969), Italian former footbal1ler
Eusebio Edjang (b. 1994), Equatorial Guinean footballer
Eusebio Escobar (b. 1936), Colombian former footballer
Eusebio Fernández Ardavín (1898–1965), Spanish screenwriter and director
Eusebio Figueroa Oreamuno (1827–1883), Costa Rican politician
Eusebio Grados (1953–2020), Peruvian huayano singer
Eusebio Guilarte (1805–1849), 10th President of Bolivia
Eusebio Guiñazú (b. 1982), Argentine rugby union player
Eusebio Guiñez (1906–1987), Argentine Olympian long-distance runner
Eusebio "El Corcho" Hernández (1911–1997), Chilean basketball player
Eusebio Jiménez (1897–????), Cuban baseballer
Eusebio Kino (1645–1711), Tyrolean Jesuit missionary
Eusebio L. Elizondo Almaguer (b. 1954), Mexican-born American Catholic prelate
Eusebio Leal (1942–2020), Cuban historian
Eusebio Mesa (b. 1939), Spanish Olympian boxer
Eusebio Monzó (b. 2000), Spanish footballer
Eusebio Pedroza (1956–2019), Panamanian boxer
Eusebio Peñalver Mazorra (1936–2006), Afro-Cuban anti-Castro political prisoner
Eusebio Poncela (b. 1947), Spanish actor
Eusebio Oehl (1827–1903), Italian histologist and physiologist
Eusebio Ojeda (1914–????), Chilean Olympian rower
Eusebio Razo Jr. (1966–2014), Mexican-born American jockey
Eusebio Ríos (1935–2008), Spanish footballer
Eusebio Rodolfo Cordón Cea (1899–1966), Provisional President of El Salvador
Eusebio Sánchez Pareja (1716–1787), Interim Viceroy of New Spain
Eusebio Sanz Asensio (d. 20th century), Spanish anarchist
Eusébio Scheid (1932–2021), Brazilian cardinal
Eusebio Sempere (1923–1985), Spanish sculptor, painter, and graphic artist
Eusebio Serna (b. 1961), Spanish wrestler
Eusebio Tejera (1922–2002), Uruguayan footballer
Eusebio Unzué (b. 1955), team manager of Movistar Team
Eusebio Valli (1755–1816), Italian physician and scientist
Eusebio Vélez (1935–2020), Spanish cyclist
Eusebio Zuloaga (1808–1898), Spanish gunsmith
Carlos Eusebio de Ayo (c. 1830–c. 1910), Mayor of Ponce, Puerto Rico
José Eusebio Barros Baeza (1810–1881), Chilean lawyer and politician
José Eusebio Caro (1817–1853), Colombian writer, journalist, and politician
José Eusebio de Llano Zapata (1721–1780), Peruvian scientist and writer
Juan Eusebio Nieremberg (1595–1658), Spanish Jesuit
Ramón Castro Ruz, Cuban revolutionary and older brother of Fidel Castro

Surname
Adriano "Tino" Eusébio (b. 1967), Santomean footballer
Alexios Eusebios (b. 1964), metropolitan of Calcutta Orthodox Diocese
André Paulo (b. 1996), Portuguese footballer
Bobby Eusebio (b. 1968), Filipino politician and architect
Fernando Eusebio (b. 1910), Italian former footballer
Fineza Eusébio (b. 1990), Angolan basketball player
Ketchup Eusebio (b. 1985), Filipino actor
José de Eusebio (b. 1966), Spanish conductor and musicologist
José Eusebio Otalora (1826–1884), 16th president of the United States of Colombia
Robi Domingo (b. 1989), Filipino actor and dancer
Tony Eusebio (b. 1967), American former baseballer

Places

Settlements
Eusébio, Ceará, Brazilian municipality
Eusebio Ayala, Paraguay, Paraguayan city and district

Structures
Crypt of Sant'Eusebio, remanent of a church in Pavia, Italy
Jose Eusebio Boronda Adobe, a Monterey colonial style California historical landmark
Sant'Eusebio, church in Rome
Statue of Eusebio Kino, bronze sculpture depicting Eusebio Kino

See also
Eusebi Güell
Eusebia (disambiguation)
Eusebius (disambiguation)